Grahams Island is an island in Devils Lake, a lake just outside the city of Devils Lake, North Dakota, which covers approximately .

People live on the island year-round, although the population increases during the warmer months. The island has one school. The North and Central parts of the island are farms, with dense forest in the South and Southwest.

Grahams Island State Park (part of Devils Lake State Park) is in the Southeast. The park, covering , is a recreation area for boating, fishing, and camping.

Most of the island lies in the unorganized territory of Lallie North, in Benson County, while its easternmost portion lies in Poplar Grove Township, in Ramsey County.

See also
 List of North Dakota state parks

References

External links
 

Landforms of Benson County, North Dakota
Landforms of Ramsey County, North Dakota
Lake islands of North Dakota